Abom is a nearly extinct language spoken in the Western Province of Papua New Guinea. According to a 2002 census, only 15 people still speak this language. All of the speakers are older adults. Middle-aged adults have some understanding of it, but no children speak or understand Abom.

Abom is spoken in Lewada, Mutam, and Tewara villages of Gogodala Rural LLG.

Classification
Abom is not close to other languages. Pawley and Hammarström (2018) classify Abom as a divergent Tirio language on the basis of morphological evidence; Abom shares the same gender ablaut pattern as other Tirio languages. Evans (2018), however, lists Abom as a separate branch of Trans-New Guinea. Suter & Usher find that it is not an Anim language (the Trans–New Guinea family that includes the Tirio languages), but does appear to be divergent Trans–New Guinea.
Part of the problem is many recorded Abom words are loans from the Inland Gulf languages, reducing the material needed for comparison.

Pronouns
Jore and Alemán (2002: 48) give pronouns for Abom as follows:

References

Bibliography
"Sociolinguistic survey of the Tirio language family", Tim Jore and Laura Aleman. Unpublished Manuscript.

External links 
 Timothy Usher, New Guinea World, Abom
OLAC resources in and about the Abom language
ELAR collection: Documentation and description of Bitur and preliminary investigation of the moribund Abom language deposited by Phillip Rogers

Languages of Western Province (Papua New Guinea)
Trans–New Guinea languages
Endangered Papuan languages
Unclassified languages of New Guinea